Knut Henriksen Dybsjord (24 April 1809 – 4 July 1866) was a Norwegian politician, Haugean lay minister and temperance movement activist.

Dybsjord was born at Hol in Buskerud, Norway. During the 1830s, Dybsjord traveled in Buskerud, Valdres and in West Norway preaching in the Haugean tradition. He was elected mayor of Ål and Hol in Hallingdal in 1850. In 1854 he chaired the first missionary association in Hol, and in 1860 he chaired the local temperance league. He died during 1866 and was buried at Hol Church at Hagafoss in Buskerud.

References

See also
1919 Norwegian prohibition referendum

1809 births
1866 deaths
People from Hol
Mayors of places in Buskerud
Norwegian Christian religious leaders
Norwegian Lutherans
Norwegian temperance activists
19th-century Lutherans